The Yarmouth Mariners are a Junior "A" team based in Yarmouth, Nova Scotia. They play in the Maritime Junior Hockey League. All home games are played out of the 1,501 seat Mariners Centre. The season usually runs from mid-September to early March every year.

History
The franchise that would eventually become the Mariners saw its first year of action in 76' as the Cole Harbour Colts. The team would remain as the Colts until 1997, where the club would turn hands and become none other than the East Hants Penguins. In 2000, the Penguins were purchased by Paul Currie, moved to Dartmouth and named the Dartmouth DQ Blizzard.

Currie ran the franchise for two seasons in Dartmouth. Although the club fared reasonably well in the standings, attendance was poor and sponsorship support was thin as the team competed heavily with Major Junior and University hockey for attention. Currie quickly made a decision to relocate the team.

Although it was not the only location considered, Yarmouth quickly became the front-runner and in 2002 Currie secured league approval and moved his team to Southwestern Nova Scotia where they would become the Yarmouth MotorMart Mariners. In their first season, the team managed to place third in the Bent and enjoyed immense fan and community support.

The 2003/2004 season was a memorable one for the team. The Mariners had a strong club and managed to plow through the playoffs with scoring from the likes of Jason Hedges, Steve Yetman, Grant Kenney, Matt Oxtoby and Justin d'Entremont. It was an exciting time for the team and their fans. However, the Mariners faced a very well coached Campbellton Tigers in the league final. Yarmouth split the first two games at home with the Tigers, but lost two in Campbellton. Returning to Yarmouth, the Mariners surrendered the championship to Campbellton. But even with the loss, fans stayed loyal and were delighted with the hockey they were treated to over that great season.

2004/2005 was the year Yarmouth hosted the Fred Page Cup. The Mariners dominated that season, ending up with 38 wins and just 14 losses, good for first overall in the league. The plan? Take a league title and carry the momentum into the Fred Page Cup. Unfortunately, it wasn't to be. In a strange turn of events, the Mariners were hit by a number of injuries at the worst time. In the first round of the playoffs, star goalie Matt Anthony was ousted from play with a knee injury. Soon after, his backup, Matt Bracegirdle would injure his groin. Losing both goalies, coupled with other injuries to key forwards, would prove too difficult to overcome as the Mariners fell to a strong Truro Bearcats in round two. Truro would go on to take the league title that season from defending Champions the Campbellton Tigers.

With a month to rest, heal and re-organize Yarmouth was ready for the Fred Page Cup. After defeating the Hawsbury Hawks in their first game, Yarmouth went 3–0 in round-robin play, much to the delight of their fans. A key component to the three wins was the return of both Matt Anthony and Matt Bracegirdle. But in the championship game, Yarmouth came up short one goal and the Hawks would leave town with the Fred Page Cup.

In 2005–2006, long-time assistant coach Laurie Barron would take on the head coaching duties. Many key veterans had moved on from the previous year, and the Mariners would find that they were to face a stronger Bent division than in previous seasons. Although the club had plenty of highs during the year, they would finish in 5th place, resulting in a 3-game mini-series with Truro. The Mariners managed to edge the Bearcats and move on, but fell to Amherst in the next round.

During the 2006–2007 season, the Mariners had a dismal season, mired in last place in the MJAHL's Bent Division basement. Paul Currie stepped down from the head coach/GM position in January, but continued behind the scenes work until the team was turned over in April. Finally, on April 3, 2007, the sale of the Mariners to East Hants Penguins (NSJHL) owner Jack Ross was completed and a new era of Mariners hockey would begin.

Following the sale of the team, the new organization quickly began to demonstrate its eagerness to return to winning form and its dedication to bringing quality Junior A Hockey back to Yarmouth and its loyal fans and sponsors. The new Mariners quickly unveiled a brand new logo and jersey and announced, to the surprise and extreme delight of many, that NHL legend Steve Kasper would take on the job of head coach with the very popular Laurie Barron as his assistant. But they didn't stop there. Over the spring and summer months, General Manager Jack Ross made numerous player movements, determined to bring in high-caliber players and instill a new belief that Yarmouth will again find itself at the top of Junior A hockey, not just in the Maritimes, but across Canada.

During the 2007–2008 season, the Mariners had many name players on the squad, which led to a very strong team. At the trading deadline in January, the Mariners only got stronger by acquiring league-leading scorer Itan Chavira, a pick-up which paid tremendous dividends for them. On February 24, 2008, with a 6–3 victory over the Halifax Wolverines on home ice, the Mariners clinched 1st overall in the MJAHL, and completed their worst-to-first turnaround in one season. In the opening round of the playoffs, the Mariners defeated the rival Amherst Ramblers 4 games to 1. In round 2, the Mariners defeated the Weeks Crushers, who hosted the 2008 Fred Page Cup, 4 games to 1, to win the Bent Division Championship. On a roll, the Mariners faced stiff opposition in the Championship Finals versus the Woodstock Slammers. After a huge 4–0 win on home ice April 15, the Mariners traveled to Woodstock for Game 6 on April 17, defeating them 3–1 and winning the series 4 games to 2, in the process clinching the Mariners first MJAHL Championship, the Kent Cup. At the 2008 Fred Page Cup, two losses on consecutive nights to eventual Champion Weeks Crushers ended the season for the club, its most successful to date.

In the 2014-15 MHL season the Mariners drew the largest average attendance.

Season-by-season record

Franchise records

These are franchise records held by previous team rosters. Figures are updated after each completed MHL regular season.

Sources

See also
List of ice hockey teams in Nova Scotia

External links
 Yarmouth Mariners official site
 Yarmouth Mariners arena site
 Mariners Centre Location

Maritime Junior Hockey League teams
Ice hockey teams in Nova Scotia
Yarmouth, Nova Scotia
Ice hockey clubs established in 1976
1976 establishments in Nova Scotia